Eugenana is a rural locality in the local government area (LGA) of Devonport in the North-west and west LGA region of Tasmania. The 2021 census recorded a population of 169 for the state suburb of Eugenana.
It is a rural suburb of Devonport. 
Lake Eugenana,  which is 123 metres above sea level, is situated here.

There is a caravan park situated by the lake.

The Tasmanian Arboretum, 60ha of park, consisting of flora and fauna is at Eugenana.

History 
Eugenana was gazetted as a locality in 1962. The name is believed to be an Aboriginal word for "eaglehawk". A postal receiving office opened in 1917, was converted to a post office about 1926, and closed in 1972.

Geography
The Don River forms part of the south-eastern boundary, before flowing through to the north.

Road infrastructure
Route C146 (Melrose Road) runs through from south-east to west.

External links
The Tasmanian Arboretum
Lakeside Caravan Park Devonport

References

Suburbs of Devonport, Tasmania